Elinor Bedell State Park is a state park of Iowa, United States. It is located on the east shore of East Okoboji Lake and represents one of the last remaining open spaces on the Iowa Great Lakes. The  park was a gift of former U.S. Congressman Berkley Bedell and his wife Elinor.

Geography
The park preserves prairie, wetland, and oak savannah. Trees include red, white and black oak, aspens, Eastern white and Scots pine, and red and sugar maples.

Facilities
A small campground has eight sites with full RV hookups, a youth group site, a playground, modern restroom and a holding tank dump station. A shelter overlooking the lake can be rented for private events. There is no beach or boat ramp within the park but several are accessible at other public facilities around the Iowa Great Lakes.

Recreation
Elinor Bedell State Park has several miles of trails.  A wildlife viewing blind is situated just off the trail for use by bird and wildlife watchers.  The area's lakes support game fish such as walleye, northern pike, smallmouth bass, white bass, perch, bluegills, crappies, catfish, and bullheads.

References

External links
 Elinor Bedell State Park

State parks of Iowa
Protected areas established in 1998
Protected areas of Dickinson County, Iowa
1998 establishments in Iowa